The 2001 South American Rugby Championship "B" was the second edition of the competition of the second level national Rugby Union teams in South America.

The tournament was played in various venue, with four teams participating and was also valid as preliminary round for 2003 Rugby World Cup – Americas qualification

Brasil won the tournament.

Standings 

 Three point for victory, two for draw, and one for lost 
{| class="wikitable"
|-
!width=165|Team
!width=40|Played
!width=40|Won
!width=40|Drawn
!width=40|Lost
!width=40|For
!width=40|Against
!width=40|Difference
!width=40|Pts
|- bgcolor=#ccffcc align=center
|align=left| 
|3||3||0||0||112||24||+ 88||9
|- align=center
|align=left| 
|3||2||0||1||104||33||+ 71||7
|- align=center
|align=left| 
|3||1||0||2||59||110||- 51||5
|- align=center
|align=left| 
|3||0||0||3||22||130||- 108||3
|}

Results

References

2001
B
rugby union
rugby union
rugby union
rugby union
2001 rugby union tournaments for national teams